Vincenzo Rosito (18 April 1939 – 29 December 2020) was an Italian football midfielder.

References

Italian footballers
1939 births
2020 deaths
Association football midfielders